Brestovo refers to the following places:

Bosnia and Herzegovina
 Brestovo (Stanari)

Bulgaria
 Brestovo, Blagoevgrad Province
 Brestovo, Lovech Province

Serbia
 Brestovo (Despotovac)
 Brestovo (Novi Pazar)
 Brestovo (Vladičin Han)